Fernando "Nando" Cózar Torres (born 2 March 1991) is a Spanish professional footballer who plays as a midfielder for St Joseph's.

Career
After failing to make an appearance for Spanish third division side Cádiz CF, Cózar played for UD Los Barrios, Chiclana CF, and Xerez Deportivo FC in the lower leagues. He joined Finnish fifth division club Legirus Inter. However, he left due to their financial problems and played for KPV and HIFK Fotboll, which he helped achieve promotion to the Finnish top flight, making two appearances there.

In 2019, Cózar signed for Angkor Tiger FC in Cambodia.

For the 2020 season, he signed for newly formed Øygarden FK but failed to make an appearance there.

In 2020, he returned to Finland with PEPO Lappeenranta.

In 2020, Cózar signed for Spanish fourth division outfit UD Lanzarote.

References

External links
 
 

Living people
1991 births
Spanish footballers
Association football midfielders
Conil CF players
Cádiz CF players
Betis Deportivo Balompié footballers
UD Los Barrios footballers
Xerez Deportivo FC footballers
Kokkolan Palloveikot players
HIFK Fotboll players
Angkor Tiger FC players
Øygarden FK players
PEPO Lappeenranta players
UD Lanzarote players
Mons Calpe S.C. players
Xerez CD footballers
Spanish expatriate footballers
Expatriate footballers in Finland
Spanish expatriate sportspeople in Finland
Expatriate footballers in Cambodia

Spanish expatriate sportspeople in Gibraltar
Expatriate footballers in Norway
Spanish expatriate sportspeople in Norway